Mount Cerberus is a prominent peak over  high, with many side peaks, between Lake Vida and Mount Orestes in the Olympus Range of Victoria Land. It was named by the Victoria University of Wellington Antarctic Expedition (1958–59) after Cerberus, a three-headed dog of Greek mythology.

References
 

Mountains of Victoria Land
McMurdo Dry Valleys